Barbara McCauley is an American romance writer. She has written over 35 romance novels for Harlequin Enterprises since 1991.

Biography
McCauley was born in Southern California. The youngest of five children, she loved reading and writing from an early age. She is married and has two children. 

McCauley published her first book in 1991, Woman Tamer. She is a past co-president of the Orange County chapter of Romance Writers of America. McCauley is a USA TODAY bestselling author and has made frequent appearances on the Waldenbooks Bestseller list.

Awards
Miss Pruitt's Private Life: 2005 RITA Awards Best Novel winner
 KISS and Achievement awards from Romantic Times
 award from Affaire de Coeur
 nine other RITA award nominations

Bibliography

Single Novels
Woman Tamer (1991)
Man from Cougar Pass (1992)
Whitehorn's Woman (1993)
Her Kind of Man (1993)
A Man Like Cade (1993)
Nightfire (1994)
Midnight Bride (1996)
The Nanny and the Reluctant Rancher (1997)
Courtship in Granite Ridge (1998)
Small Mercies (1998)

Texas's Hearts Of Stone Series
Texas Heat (1995)
Texas Temptation (1995)
Texas Pride (1995)

Conveniently Wed Series Multi-Author
Seduction of the Reluctant Bride (1998)

Secrets By Blackhawk-Sinclair Saga Series
Blackhawk's Sweet Revenge (1999)
Secret Baby Santos (1999)
Killian's Passion (1999)
Callan's Proposition (2000)
Gabriel's Honor (2000)
Reese's Wild Wager (2001)
Sinclair's Surprise Baby (2001)
Taming Blackhawk (2002)
In Blackhawk's Bed (2002)
That Blackhawk Bride (2003)
Miss Pruitt's Private Life (2004)
Blackhawk Legacy (2004)
Blackhawk's Betrayal (2006)
Blackhawk's Bond (2006)
Blackhawk's Affair (2007)

Fortunes of Texas Series Multi-Author
Fortune's Secret Daughter (2001)

Crown and Glory Series Multi-Author
Royally Pregnant (2002)

Dynasties the Barones Series Multi-Author
Where There's Smoke (2003)

Dynasties the Danforths Series Multi-Author
The Cinderella Scandal (2004)

Dynasties the Ashtons Series Multi-Author
Name Your Price (2005)

Omnibus In Collaboration
It's Raining Men! (2001) (with Elizabeth Bevarly)
Surprise Baby (2002) (with Kathie DeNosky)
Taming Blackhawk / Michael's Temptation (2002) (with Eileen Wilks)
Summer Gold (2003) (with Elizabeth Lowell)
Taming the Prince / Royally Pregnant (2003) (with Elizabeth Bevarly)
Billionaire Bachelors: Garrett / In Blackhawk's Bed (2003) (with Anne Marie Winston)
The Blackhawk Bride / Billionaire Bachelors: Gray (2004) (with Anne Marie Winston)
Where There's Smoke... / Beauty and The Blue Angel (2004) (with Maureen Child)
Dynasties: Summer in Savannah (2004) (with Maureen Child and Sheri Whitefeather)
The Cinderella Scandal / Man Beneath the Uniform (2004) (with Maureen Child)
Laying His Claim / Miss Pruitt's Private Life (2005) (with Beverly Barton)
Passionate Secrets (2006) (with Maggie Shayne)
Summer Desires (2006) (with Joan Johnston and Wendy Rosnau) (Wolf River Summer / Hawk's Way / Virgin Groom / Long Hot Summer)
Savour the Seduction / Name Your Price (2006) (with Laura Wright)
One Hot Summer (2007) (with Joan Johnston and Diana Palmer)
In His Bed (2007) (with Linda Winstead Jones)

Poems
The Darkness That Was There All Along (2004)

External links
Barbara McCauley's Official Website
Barbara McCauley at Harlequin Enterprises Ltd
Barbara McCauley at Mills & Boon
Barbara McCauley at Fantastic Fiction

American romantic fiction writers
Year of birth missing (living people)
Living people
RITA Award winners